Nick McGrath MHA is a Canadian politician in Newfoundland and Labrador, Canada.

McGrath was elected to the Newfoundland and Labrador House of Assembly in the 2011 provincial election and represented the electoral district of Labrador West. He lost re-election in the 2015 election. He previously served as Minister of Transportation and Works, Minister of Service NL and Minister of Intergovernmental and Aboriginal Affairs. Before entering provincial politics McGrath was a town councillor in Labrador City, President of Combined Councils of Labrador, and a businessman in Labrador West.

Background
McGrath was born and raised in St. John's before moving to the mining area of Labrador West in the 1970s. He has run six businesses in the area and is a longtime volunteer. Prior to his election as MHA he served on the Labrador City Town Council and was President of Combined Council of Labrador.

Politics
In August 2011, McGrath defeated Peter McCormick and Olympic gold medallist Mark Nichols to win the Progressive Conservative nomination in the district of Labrador West. In the October provincial election McGrath was elected as the MHA, winning 51 percent of the popular vote. On October 28, 2011, McGrath was sworn in as the Minister for Intergovernmental and Aboriginal Affairs and Minister Responsible for Labrador Affairs, and the Voluntary and Non-Profit Sector.

On October 9, 2013, McGrath was appointed Minister of Transportation and Works. He resigned as Minister on September 29, 2014, following a report by the Auditor General which indicated McGrath pushed through the cancellation of a multimillion-dollar contract (Humber Valley Paving Ltd) within hours without notifying senior government officials or the premier. Premier Paul Davis stated that he would have asked for McGrath's resignation had he not quit first.

In the 2015 provincial election McGrath placed third after Liberal victor Graham Letto and New Democrat Ron Barron.

In 2017, McGrath was elected to the Labrador City town council.

In October 2020, McGrath was chosen as the Progressive Conservative candidate for Labrador West in the province's next election. He was defeated by incumbent NDP MHA Jordan Brown; placing third in the 2021 election. In the 2021 municipal election, McGrath was defeated for re-election.

Electoral record

2021

2015

|-

|-

|NDP
|Ron Barron
|align="right"|1,152
|align="right"|34.7
|align="right"|+2.06
|-

|-
|}

2011

|-

|-

|NDP
|Tom Harris
|align="right"|1,181
|align="right"|32.64
|align="right"|-9.95
|-

|-
|}

References

External links
 PC Party biography

Progressive Conservative Party of Newfoundland and Labrador MHAs
People from Labrador City
Politicians from St. John's, Newfoundland and Labrador
Living people
Year of birth missing (living people)
21st-century Canadian politicians
Members of the Executive Council of Newfoundland and Labrador